Kevin Bazinet (born June 14, 1991) is a Canadian pop singer, who won the third season of the reality television series La Voix in 2015.

Originally from Mont-Laurier, Quebec, he is the younger brother of singer Bobby Bazini. In the late 2000s, he became a popular performer on YouTube, performing both original songs and covers, and received a recording contract offer from EMI France in 2009. However, the contract fell through as Bazinet battled anxiety disorder. After taking time away from the business to look after his physical and emotional health, he reemerged in 2015 as a competitor on La Voix, auditioning with a take on Sam Smith's acoustic version of "Latch".

In the finale on April 12, he performed "Jusqu’où tu m’aimes", a song written by his coach Marc Dupré and Alex Nevsky. He was named the winner at the end of the episode, with 46 per cent of the audience vote.

On May 12, "Jusqu'où tu m'aimes" was released as his first radio single. The song peaked at #2 on Quebec's French language pop charts.

In June, Bobby and Kevin performed together on Quebec's Opération Enfant Soleil telethon, duetting on a version of The Bee Gees' "To Love Somebody".

Bazinet performed at the Stanley Cup 125th Tribute Concert in Ottawa, Ontario on March 17, 2017.

References

1991 births
Canadian pop singers
Singers from Quebec
The Voice (franchise) winners
Living people
People from Mont-Laurier
French Quebecers
French-language singers of Canada
Participants in Canadian reality television series
21st-century Canadian male singers